Madina Ndangiza is a Rwandan politician. She was the Deputy General secretary of the Ideal Democratic Party (P.D.I).

Education 
Madina is a graduate from the National University of Rwanda with a Bachelor’s degree in Law.

References 

21st-century Rwandan women politicians
21st-century Rwandan politicians
Living people
Year of birth missing (living people)